The discography of Celph Titled, an underground rapper from Tampa, Florida.

Discography 
Solo albums
 The Gatalog: A Collection of Chaos (2006, Endless Recording Company)

with Apathy
 No Place Like Chrome (2007)
 On - EP (2012)
 War Syndrome (2014, album sold on European Tour)
 Unseen Obscene (2016, Tour EP)
 Demonology (2017, Tour EP)
 Blue Sky on Mars (2018, Tour EP)

with Army of the Pharaohs
 The Torture Papers (2006)
 Ritual of Battle (2007)
 The Unholy Terror (2010)
 In Death Reborn (2014)
 Heavy Lies the Crown (Army of the Pharaohs album) (2014)

with Buckwild
 Nineteen Ninety Now (2010)
 Nineteen Ninety More (2011)

with The Demigodz
The Gods Must Be Crazy (2002, EP)
The Gods Must Be Crazier (2007)
 Killmatic (2013)

with J-Zone as "The Boss Hog Barbarians"
 Every Hog Has Its Day (2006)

Hip hop discographies
Discographies of American artists